Ready for the Victory is a song by Modern Talking. It was the first single on their eleventh album, Victory.

In Russia, the single was released with additional tracks including the megamix Space Mix '98.

Track listing 
CD-Maxi Hansa 74321 92038 2 (BMG) / EAN 0743219203823 18.02.2002
 "Ready For The Victory" (Radio Version) - 3:31
 "Ready For The Victory" (Alternative Radio Version) - 3:16
 "Ready For The Victory" (Club Version) - 5:12
 "Ready For The Victory" (Extended Version) - 5:27
 "Ready For The Victory" (Alternative Radio Version Extended) - 5:15
 "Ready For The Victory" (Instrumental) - 3:31
 "Ready For The Victory" (Video)

CD-Maxi Russian Version 2002
 "Ready For The Victory" (Radio Version) - 3:31
 "Ready For The Victory" (Alternative Radio Version) - 3:16
 "Ready For The Victory" (Extended Version) - 5:27
 "Rouge Et Noir" (Album Version) - 3:14
 "Space Mix" (Album Version) - 17:14

Charts

Weekly charts

Year-end charts

References

External links

Modern Talking songs
2002 singles
Songs written by Dieter Bohlen